Rhabdophis barbouri, also known commonly as Barbour's water snake, is a species of keelback snake in the family Colubridae. The species is endemic to the Philippines.

Etymology
The specific name, barbouri, is in honor of American herpetologist Thomas Barbour.

Geographic range
R. barbouri is found on the island of Luzon.

Reproduction
R. barbouri is oviparous.

References

Further reading
Malnate EV (1960). "Systematic Division and Evolution of the Colubrid Snake Genus Natrix, with Comments on the Subfamily Natricinae". Proceedings of the Academy of Natural Sciences of Philadelphia 112: 41–71. (Macropophis barbouri, new combination).
Malnate EV, Underwood G (1988). "Australasian Natricine Snakes of the Genus Tropidonophis ". Proc. Acad. Nat. Sci. Philadelphia 140 (1): 59–201. (Rhabdophis barbouri, new combination, p. 195).
Taylor EH (1922). "Additions to the herpetological fauna of the Philippine Islands, II". Philippine Journal of Science 21 (3): 257–303 + Plates 1–4. (Natrix barbouri, new species, pp. 291–293).

Rhabdophis
Snakes of Southeast Asia
Reptiles of the Philippines
Endemic fauna of the Philippines
Reptiles described in 1922
Taxa named by Edward Harrison Taylor